The yellow-blotched forest-skink or rainforest water-skink (Concinnia tigrina)  is a species of skink found in Queensland in Australia.

References

Concinnia
Reptiles described in 1888
Taxa named by Charles Walter De Vis
Taxobox binomials not recognized by IUCN